Local elections were held in Georgia on October 5, 2006. The elections follow a decree issued on August 26 by President of Georgia Mikheil Saakashvili, setting the date for the local ballot.

This vote was considered to be the first major test of the authorities commitment to a transparent process in non-revolutionary circumstances. In addition they were to demonstrate the level of public confidence in both the NMD - after a series of scandals - and the opposition, which has begun to strengthen and reorganise that year.

The elections coincided with a very tense period of relations with Russia. After a major diplomatic row regarding alleged Russian spying, the Kremlin has severed all transport and post links with Georgia.

According to preliminary results, the elections were won by the United National Movement led by President Saakashvili with an overwhelming majority. The predominantly Armenian-populated city of Akhalkalaki was the only municipality where an opposition grouping, the Industry Will Save Georgia Party, won a majority of votes. According to international observers, particularly the OSCE Office for Democratic Institutions and Human Rights (ODIHR) and the Congress of Local and Regional Authorities of the Council of Europe, the "municipal elections in Georgia were conducted with general respect for fundamental freedoms; however, the blurred distinction between the ruling authorities and the leading party reinforced the advantage of the incumbents".

References

External links
The Central Election Commission of Georgia 
Adam Carr's Election Archive

Georgia
Local elections
2006
October 2006 events in Europe